Elmaların yongası is a Turkish folkloric tune (türkü). Elmaların yongası is a form of the Turkish folk dance Kaşık Havası. The time signature is 4/4, and the makam is çargah. "Elmalar" means apples and "yonga" means chip (that is the cut, chipped one).

There are similar folkloric dance tune, known as Nizamikos, in Narthern Greece. It is danced by men, and is very widespread in the city of Naousa.

Original form
The original form of the türkü was popular in Konya.

See also
Ballos
Syrtos

References

Turkish music
Turkish songs
Year of song unknown
Songwriter unknown